Zander MacKenzie (born 28 August 2005) is a Scottish professional footballer who plays for Scottish Championship club Partick Thistle.

Career

Partick Thistle 
Aged 16 MacKenzie graduated from the Thistle Weir youth academy and joined the club’s first team on a two year contract, as a modern apprentice.

MacKenzie made his first team debut for Thistle in September 2022, in the Scottish Challenge Cup, coming off the bench away to Falkirk. MacKenzie made his first league appearance for Thistle as a substitute in a 3-2 home defeat to Dundee, in November 2022.

References

External links

2005 births
Living people
Scottish footballers
Scottish Professional Football League players
Partick Thistle F.C. players
Association football midfielders